Red Dead Online is a 2019 action-adventure game developed and published by Rockstar Games as the online component of Red Dead Redemption 2. After several months in beta, it was released for the PlayStation 4 and Xbox One in May 2019, and for Windows and Stadia in November 2019. A standalone client for the game was released in December 2020. In Red Dead Online, players control a customizable silent protagonist who is freed from prison after being framed for murder, and tasked with taking revenge in exchange for proving their innocence. Set in 1898, one year before the events of Red Dead Redemption 2, the game comprises story missions where up to four players can complete tasks to advance the narrative, as well as various side missions and events.

Like the single-player game, Red Dead Online is presented through both first and third-person perspectives, and players may freely roam in its interactive open world. Gameplay elements include shootouts, hunting, horseback riding, interacting with non-player characters, and maintaining the character's honor rating through moral choices and deeds. A bounty system governs the response of law enforcement and bounty hunters to crimes committed by players. Players can traverse the open world alone or in a posse of up to seven players, with or against whom they can partake in organized activities. Developed in tandem with the single-player story, Red Dead Online was viewed as a separate product despite the development team's wishes to translate elements of the single-player to a multiplayer environment. The team took lessons learned from the multiplayer of Red Dead Redemption and Grand Theft Auto Online.

Red Dead Online received criticism at launch for its balancing of gameplay and in-game currency; later updates addressed the issues. It received positive responses with praise for its presentation of missions, co-operative events, and technical improvements. Like Grand Theft Auto Online, the game received several updates adding new content, including various roles players can select to earn additional rewards. Reception to post-release content was generally positive, with praise directed at the more significant additions, though the lack of new content over time led to some criticism. The final major update was released in July 2021, as Rockstar later withdrew development resources to focus on the next Grand Theft Auto game.

Gameplay 

Red Dead Online is the multiplayer component of the 2018 video game Red Dead Redemption 2. Played from a first or third-person perspective, the game is set in an open-world environment featuring a fictionalized version of the United States. Player progression in the single-player story does not affect the multiplayer game. Upon entering the game world, players customize a character and are free to explore the environment alone or in a "posse" group. Players can partake in organized activities with or against members of their posse, or against other groups. As players complete activities throughout the game world, they receive experience points to raise their characters in rank and receive bonuses, thereby progressing in the game. Camps can be temporarily set up throughout the world, either for an individual player or a posse, where players can rest, access their wardrobe, craft, cook, and fast-travel. Horses are the main forms of transportation, of which there are various breeds, each with different attributes. Players must either train or tame a wild horse to use it. Increased use of a horse will begin a bonding process, which can be increased by cleaning and feeding it, and the player will acquire advantages as they ride their horse. Players must insure their horse so it heals over time and can respawn.

Dispersed throughout the game world are story missions in which four players complete tasks to advance the game's narrative. The game world also features events in which up to 32 players can partake individually or with a posse group. Event types include a deathmatch mode devoid of firearms and a race mode by horseback. Players are notified when a competitive event begins somewhere in the game world and are given the option to immediately travel to the event. Alternatively, players can join specific events at will. Outside events, non-player character ("strangers") in the game world offer missions, such as contract killings or camp raidings. Up to four players can join a temporary, ad hoc posse group for the duration of a game session. Alternatively, for a fee, up to seven players can join a persistent posse that regenerates when its leader comes online. Within a persistent posse, players can customize the group's style and track player stats. Friendly fire can be disabled so teammates do not injure each other. If two players continue to kill each other, the game presents two optional modes: parley, in which the players cannot interact with each other for a short period of time; and feud, where the two players partake in a three-minute shootout.

Red Dead Online adds several new systems atop the single-player mode's gameplay. In addition to in-game cash, which can be used for supplies, Online adds gold, a second in-game currency used to purchase luxury and special items, and tokens, which are earned by unlocking role ranks and can be used to purchase role-specific items. Players acquire gold nuggets by completing challenges and can convert 100 nuggets into gold bars. Rather than having to travel to a town's store, online player characters can order supplies anywhere from a handheld catalog. The orders become available for pickup in any town's post office or the player's camp. Online introduces "ability cards", in which players can activate one active and three passive powers for their characters. Players receive these cards by rising in rank or direct purchase, and can then upgrade the cards with in-game currency and experience points. Red Dead Online uses the Honor system from the single-player story, measuring how the player's actions are perceived in terms of morality. Morally positive choices and deeds like helping strangers and abiding the law will add up to the player's Honor, while negative deeds such as theft and harming innocents will subtract from the player's Honor. Some story missions can only be initiated if the player's Honor is at a particular level.

Synopsis

A Land of Opportunity 
The narrative takes place in 1898, one year before the events of Red Dead Redemption 2. The player takes on the role of a silent protagonist who is arrested for murder and imprisoned in Sisika Penitentiary. Six months into their sentence and awaiting execution, their prison transport is held up by a band of hired guns. Their leader, Horley, escorts the player to his employer, the widow Jessica LeClerk, who reveals the player was unfairly accused of murdering her husband Philip, who she suspects was actually killed by his business partners: banker Jeremiah Shaw, landowners Amos and Grace Lancing, and Grace's brother, outlaw Teddy Brown, with the aim of taking over the entire business. Jessica enlists the player's help in avenging Philip's death in exchange for proving their innocence and allows them to leave.

After the player is provided with a camp and some work, they meet with Horley in Blackwater; he advises them to work with the local sheriffs and earn some money while he investigates Philip's murder. Eventually, Horley tells the player to seek work with either U.S. Marshal Tom Davies or mercenary Samson Finch, depending on the player's honor level. If the player has high honor, Davies enlists the player's posse to join the hunt for Mexican bandit Alfredo Montez; with low honor, Finch has the player's posse prove themselves for an upcoming job by helping him rob a factory during a labor strike and exact revenge on his former partner, who is protected by a corrupt garrison.

After either series of events, the player's posse meets with Horley and Jessica to help them kill Teddy Brown, who is hiding out with his gang near the abandoned Fort Mercer. With the assistance of the local authorities, the player's posse besieges the fort and eliminates Brown's men, before capturing Brown himself, who is swiftly killed by Jessica afterwards. The player then continues working for either Davies or Finch, helping the former deal with retribution from Montez's gang, or assisting the latter with a bank robbery in Saint Denis.

Meanwhile, Amos and Shaw try to finalize their takeover of Philip's business by coercing Jessica into signing a forged contract. Accompanied by Horley and the player's posse, Jessica meets the two men and their bodyguards in Blackwater. When Amos denies any involvement in Philip's death, an enraged Jessica shoots him dead with a pistol hidden in her purse. The player's posse retrieves the contract from Shaw, and escorts Jessica and Horley out of Blackwater. With only Grace left to be dealt with in order to avenge Philip, Jessica vows to do so one day, and laments her vendetta has led to both her and Horley becoming fugitives. She then thanks the player's posse for their help and informs them the evidence clearing their name will be delivered, before leaving with Horley to go into hiding.

A Life of 'Shine 
A Life of 'Shine is a story chapter added in December 2019. The player character is introduced to "Lightning" Maggie Fike, who once controlled the moonshining business in Lemoyne but disappeared after falling afoul of revenue agents led by the ruthless Reid Hixon. Maggie convinces the player to finance her new operation and help her take revenge on Hixon. The player rescues Maggie's nephew Lem from the revenuers, attracting the attention of the bankrupt Braithwaite family, who have turned to moonshining and recruited Maggie's former cook Danny-Lee Caton to oversee production. The Braithwaites threaten retaliation after the player sabotages their moonshining operation, while Hixon learns about Maggie's revived business and ambushes the player and Lem on a job. To deal with both of their enemies simultaneously, Maggie arranges a supposed peace meeting with the Braithwaites and anonymously tips off Hixon. At the meeting, Hixon arrests the player, Lem, and Danny-Lee, but they manage to escape after Lem detonates an improvised bomb using the moonshine in his wagon. With Lem's help, the player kills Hixon and captures Danny-Lee, bringing the latter back to Maggie who allows him to leave on the condition he vanish forever. The player then returns to producing moonshine with Maggie and Lem.

Development 
Red Dead Online was developed in tandem with the single-player story. Though Red Dead Online and Red Dead Redemption 2 share assets and gameplay, Rockstar views them as separate products with independent trajectories, reflected in its decision to launch the multiplayer title separately. The development team took lessons learned from the multiplayer of Red Dead Redemption (2010) and applied those with the best elements of Grand Theft Auto Online (2013), particularly in regards to introducing narrative elements to a multiplayer title. The team sought to translate elements of the single-player story to Red Dead Online, overhauling them for an online space. Producer Rob Nelson felt, while the team's experience on Grand Theft Auto Online helped with the foundations of Red Dead Online, the differences in the game's direction, pace, and scale demanded a different overall approach, slowly leading the player into the world with smaller steps instead of the fast pace of Grand Theft Auto Online.

Red Dead Online public beta opened on November 27, 2018, to players who owned a special edition of the base game, and then progressively opened to all owners. The progressive release was a choice by Rockstar to mitigate any major performance issues by the influx of players. Rockstar added and adapted several modes during the beta stage, and made changes to the balance and economy. Player progression in the public beta carried over when the beta ended on May 14, 2019. Red Dead Online implements microtransactions by letting players purchase gold bars for in-game items such as weapons and cosmetics. Rockstar had adopted a similar approach for Grand Theft Auto Online. Rockstar donated five percent of in-game revenue generated in Red Dead Online and Grand Theft Auto Online in April and May 2020 to relief efforts of the COVID-19 pandemic. Each of its nine worldwide studios donated to local charities. Rockstar closed the game for two hours on June 4, 2020, to honor the memorial of George Floyd. A standalone client for Red Dead Online, which does not require the base Red Dead Redemption 2 game, was released on December 1, 2020, for PlayStation 4, Windows, and Xbox One.

Additional content 

Post-release content is continually added to Red Dead Online through free title updates. Rockstar planned to evolve the world over time, including expanding the player's in-game businesses from a small camp to a larger company. Rockstar intended to add more role-playing elements to Red Dead Online over time, including additional roles and missions. One of the team's greater challenges was the addition of experiences that allow player freedom without too much structure. The first update to the game world was in December 2018, wherein saloons played Christmas music. To coincide with the full release in May 2019, Rockstar released an update that added new story missions, dynamic events, free roam activities, and poker.

The Frontier Pursuits update, released on September 10, 2019, implemented three new roles: bounty hunter, where players earn rewards by tracking down targets; trader, where players collect and sell items to expand their camp into a business; and collector, focused on discovering collectibles using items such as a metal detector and binoculars. The development team implemented roles as a result of frequent player requests for a stronger connection to their character; Nelson noted the team enjoyed the immersion of Rockstar's open worlds and wanted to extrapolate that feeling for personalized characters. The trajectory of the roles is intentionally slower than Grand Theft Auto Onlines missions, with each role originally set to have logical successors gradually advancing players' financial success. The update added an Outlaw Pass, which grants players access to additional rewards for an in-game price, and a limited promotion named the Wheeler, Rawson & Co Club, where players could unlock specific rewards as they gained experience. With each of the roles, players are assigned special tasks for a limited time, such as Legendary Bounties for bounty hunters and specific items for collectors. Fear of the Dark, a limited event for Showdown Mode, was added for Halloween in October and November, dividing players into Hunters and Night Stalkers. The Moonshiners update, added on December 13, 2019, introduced moonshiner as an extension to the trader role, focusing on producing, managing, and distributing moonshine. The update included additional content, such as the first purchasable property and a new Outlaw Pass. To celebrate Christmas in December 2019, Rockstar granted free supplies to players and added a temporary period of snowfall.

The Naturalist, released on July 28, 2020, added a fifth role, revolving around players tracking down animals to study or hunt them. The update added new clothing, animals, and an Outlaw Pass. The team enjoyed the single-player's animal hunting mechanics and felt it could be effectively imitated in Red Dead Online. The naturalist's Vitalism Studies feature, allowing players to temporarily assume control of an animal, was viewed as an experience that "bend[s] reality" in contrast to the otherwise grounded tone. For Halloween in October 2020, Rockstar added a new mode, Dead of Night, wherein players fight against zombies. The Halloween Pass, which was available from October 20 to November 16, added several Halloween-themed reward, including horse masks, emotes, and weapon variations. The team felt the events reflected some of the mysteries present in single-player. The Bounty Hunters update was released simultaneously with the standalone client in December 2020, adding new ranks to the bounty hunter role and three additional targets to track down, as well as a new Outlaw Pass and bonus items. Snowfall returned for Christmas 2020, alongside an additional weapon and gun variant. Three solo missions were added on February 16, 2021; Rockstar intended to add more in the future. Eight horse races were added on May 25, 2021.

Blood Money was released on July 13, 2021; it was previously detailed in May and June, followed by an official announcement and trailer on July 6 and 7. It added missions focused on the criminal underworld, with players helping Guido Martelli create his own criminal network in Saint Denis. The update was the result of the developers wanting further criminal experiences. Martelli, a character originally referenced in single-player, was added to gain consistency between the two modes. The update added the ability to rob homesteads and camps. In both missions and free roam, players can find Capitale, a valuable commodity sought by Martelli which he exchanges for further criminal opportunities; the developers saw these as a way to add complex missions wherein players can find new strategies for completion. Released alongside Blood Money was the Quick Draw Club, a series of four passes providing players with rewards and bonuses to assist gameplay; the first reward is the outfit of Dutch van der Linde, a character from single-player. Purchasing all four passes granted players access to the Halloween Pass 2. One of the characters added in Blood Money, guitar player "Bluewater" John, is portrayed by musician Christone "Kingfish" Ingram; an original song co-written by Ingram, "Letter from Bluewater Man", was released as a digital single on August 20. A new mode, All Hallows' Call to Arms, was added for Halloween in October 2021, allowing players to defend four locations from wild animals supernatural elements like a ghost train, alongside the return of Dead of Night and the addition of the Halloween Pass 2, which included 15 ranks granting several Halloween-themed rewards. Snowfall, music, and decorations returned for Christmas in December 2021 alongside new holiday-themed maps and bonuses for currency and levels.

In July 2022, Rockstar announced Red Dead Online would not be receiving any more major updates, instead focusing on smaller missions and the expansion of existing modes as development resources were withdrawn to focus on the next entry in the Grand Theft Auto series. Three new Hardcore Telegram missions were added in an update on September 6, 2022. Previous Halloween content—All Hallows' Call to Arms, Dead of Night, Fear of the Dark, and the Halloween Pass 2—returned in October 2022, alongside a new Hardcore Telegram mission on October 18.

Reception 
Red Dead Online received criticism at launch for its in-game currency rewards for activities, with players complaining they were too low for the cost of goods and upgrades. Some players calculated a single gold bar could take an estimated eight hours to earn in the game. Rockstar agreed to re-balance the game's economy following complaints. Similar complaints emerged about the griefing taking place in the game; Rockstar fixed these issues by making player visibility dependent on their proximity and behavior. The Verge reported several users who played as black characters had been targeted by griefers posing as Ku Klux Klan-inspired clans or slave catchers who often called them racial slurs.

IGNs Luke Reilly praised the game's co-operative story missions, noting the player versus player modes typically have a skill imbalance. Reilly lauded the technical improvements made throughout the updates, though noted some remained. Matt Martin of VG247 found the game to be more enjoyable than Grand Theft Auto Online, from both a technical and gameplay perspective. Martin criticized some balancing issues, but attributed them to the beta status. The Verges Andrew Webster found Red Dead Onlines battle royale mode more tense than games like Fortnite due to the smaller player count and slower playstyle. Kotakus Heather Alexandra wrote Red Dead Online was "gamier" than its single-player counterpart, specifically in seeing the realistic towns transformed into deathmatch levels. John Saavedra of Den of Geek criticized the simplicity of the story missions and wrote the free roam missions are a better way to "break up the monotony" of traversing the world. Christian Just of GameStar felt Red Dead Online carried most of the strengths of the single-player, effectively fulfilling his childhood fantasy of cowboy life.

Red Dead Online was nominated for Best Multiplayer Game at the 2019 Golden Joystick Awards. Rockstar's parent company Take-Two Interactive reported the game hit peak players in December 2019 following the release of the Moonshiners update; this was surpassed in December 2020, which saw more new and returning players since the game's beta launch.

Post-release reception 
Jordan Oloman of Eurogamer appreciated the improvements made by May 2019, praising the quality of the story missions, but felt players needed more purpose within the world. After the release of the Frontier Pursuits update in September 2019, Oloman found the game enjoyable enough to play instead of returning to single-player. Polygons Cass Marshall wrote the update added elements that made the game fun to play with friends. Eurogamers Oloman considered the December 2019 Moonshiners update the best to date, and found the new characters compelling. Kotakus Zack Zwiezen echoed this sentiment, praising the amount of content available. In May 2020, the game was used by a group of employees to conduct online business meetings instead of Skype or Zoom; the immersion of the world was cited as an appealing feature, though the technical issues and lengthy tutorial were criticized for new employees. Several players reported to playing as a refuge during COVID-19 lockdowns; the Rift Trails, a group of equestrians who hosted daily rides through the world, grew to over 2,500 members by 2022. In July 2020, several players dressed their characters as clowns to demonstrate their displeasure at the game's lack of updates. Kotakus Zwiezen considered The Naturalist update "a step back" from Moonshiners, but found it made him appreciate the nature and details. Polygons Marshall called the update "perfectly fine" but noted it failed to make the game "feel meaningfully different" like the varied Grand Theft Auto Online updates. Writing for NME, Oloman felt the update contradicted the "ruthless" nature of the game and the tasks had become repetitive. PC Gamers Christopher Livingston described it as "surprisingly disappointing", citing its similarity to the trader role.

Following a patch released in August 2020, several players reported significant, game-breaking glitches; in response, Rockstar reverted the game to a previous version. Kotakus Zwiezen considered the October 2020 Halloween update "disappointing" due to the lack of memorable or significant content. He criticized the December 2020 update, perceiving Rockstar's favoritism to Grand Theft Auto Online. The update received similar criticism from several players, who felt it was lacking in content and rewards. Conversely, Zwiezen considered the February 2021 solo missions to be an improvement as it alleviated concerns of dealing with other players. In March 2021, Alex Avard of GamesRadar+ wrote Red Dead Online could "reach its true potential" if it continued to build upon the momentum of the previous year, though noted the monetization system remained unbalanced. In July 2021, Polygons Marshall felt Blood Money was suitable for regular players, but noted the lack of regular updates was "frustrating" due to the game's potential. Rion Duncan of Screen Rant felt the Blood Money missions were too similar to stranger missions, criticizing the lack of preparatory gameplay for the heists as seen in Grand Theft Auto Online. Otto Kratky of Digital Trends praised Blood Money and wrote, unlike with previous updates, Rockstar was "finally appealing to those Old West clichés" and setting the game in the right direction. In December 2021, PC Gamers Lauren Morton expressed disappointment at the lack of activity compared to Rockstar's other projects throughout the year, though noted it "remains as expansive and gorgeous as ever".

The January 2022 update—bonus rewards for existing missions—led to some backlash from players as they considered it "low effort" and described the game as "dead" due to the lack of new content; players and reporters compared it to Grand Theft Auto Online, which received major updates in July and December 2021, while Red Dead Onlines most recent Blood Money update was considered lackluster in comparison. An online fan campaign ensued; the hashtag #SaveRedDeadOnline trended on Twitter, with over 18,000 tweets. When a new mode in Grand Theft Auto Online was released on January 13 without an announcement from Rockstar, Kotakus Zack Zwiezen partly attributed its silence to the #SaveRedDeadOnline campaign. Several of Rockstar's social media posts were met with responses in support of the campaign, and some Rockstar employees were reportedly spammed with abuse. In May 2022, Take-Two Interactive's chief executive officer, Strauss Zelnick, said the companies had "heard the frustration" and "more will be said by Rockstar in due time". On July 13, 2022, players hosted an in-game funeral for Red Dead Online to mark one year since the release of Blood Money, the last major update, and to mourn Rockstar's decision to withdraw development resources. Several players met at graveyards and cemeteries in the world to capture photographs and drink alcohol. TheGamers Stacey Henley was disappointed by Rockstar's decision, but felt it was inevitable due to the game being "forced to live in the shadow" of Grand Theft Auto Online; she felt it was "never going to be" good, and concluded "Rockstar offering us some real closure on the issue is all we can ask for". Players and community members criticized the treatment for its false promises and missed opportunities, despite its success relative to non-Rockstar games. Many players and communities remained committed to continuing their activities despite the lack of major updates.

Notes

References

External links 
 

2019 video games
Action-adventure games
Euphoria (software) games
Fiction set in 1898
Hunting in video games
Multiplayer online games
Multiplayer video games
Open-world video games
Persistent worlds
PlayStation 4 games
PlayStation 4 Pro enhanced games
Red Dead Redemption 2
Rockstar Advanced Game Engine games
Rockstar Games games
Stadia games
Take-Two Interactive games
Video games developed in Canada
Video games developed in India
Video games developed in the United Kingdom
Video games developed in the United States
Video games produced by Dan Houser
Video games set in the 19th century
Video games set in the United States
Video games with customizable avatars
Video games written by Dan Houser
Western (genre) video games
Windows games
Xbox One games
Xbox One X enhanced games